Al-Hilal United Football Club, or simply Al Hilal United, is an Emirati professional football club, based in the city of Al Lisaili, Dubai. Founded in 2019, the club competes in the UAE Second Division League.

History
Al-Hilal United FC was founded in 2019 in Al Lisaili, Dubai, United Arab Emirates, and around February 2020, it was announced that Abdullah bin Musa'ad bin Abdulaziz Al Saud has ownership to the newly established club.

The club began their journey through competing in the UAE Second Division League, the third tier of Emirati football, during the 2019–20 season. They ended the following season on fifth position with 23 points in 17 matches.

In the 2020–21 UAE Division 2 season, they achieved success and qualified for the play-offs after finishing on top of Group A with 32 points in 14 matches. Later their journey came to an end after losing 9–0 to Abtal Al Khaleej.

On 31 March 2022, Al-Hilal United hosted AFC Champions League debutant Mumbai City in a friendly game, that ended as a 2–0 defeat for the hawks.

Home stadium
Al-Hilal used The Sevens Stadium in Dubai for their home games during their earlier seasons. In 2021–22 season, Al Hilal rented a pitch at Al Hamriya Sports Club Stadium to play for their home fixtures as The Sevens had too many teams using it as their home base.

Current squad 

As of 2021–22 season:

Coaching staff

Affiliated clubs
The following clubs are currently affiliated with:
 Sheffield United F.C. (2020–present)
 Kerala United FC (2020–present)
 K Beerschot VA (2020–present)
 LB Châteauroux (2021–present)

See also
List of football clubs in the United Arab Emirates

References

External links

Al-Hilal United FC profile at sofascore.com

Football clubs in Dubai
Hilal
Association football clubs established in 2019
2019 establishments in the United Arab Emirates